The James Irvine Foundation is a philanthropic nonprofit organization established to benefit the people of California. The foundation's grantmaking focuses on a California where all low-income workers have the power to advance economically.

The foundation was created in 1937 by James Harvey Irvine Sr. (1867–1947), as a charitable organization to hold controlling stock in the Irvine Company, because his intended successor, James Harvey Irvine Jr. (1894–1935) died of tuberculosis in 1935. Since 1937 the foundation has provided more than $1.98 billion in grants to nonprofit organizations throughout California. With about $3.8 billion in assets, the foundation made grants of $129 million in 2021.

The foundation is based in San Francisco, with an office in Los Angeles. The current president & CEO of the James Irvine Foundation is Don Howard.

Grantmaking

In 2016, the Irvine Foundation announced it would focus its grantmaking on expanding economic and political opportunity for Californians who are working but struggling with poverty.

History

James Irvine's father was an Irish immigrant who arrived in San Francisco in 1849 during the California Gold Rush and established himself as a successful businessman. Upon his father's death, James Irvine inherited the land, which at the time was used as a stock ranch, and turned it into one of the largest, most productive agricultural enterprises in the state.

In response to the Great Depression, James Irvine decided to establish a foundation in 1937 that would promote the "general well-being of the citizens and residents of the state of California." The foundation became the primary stockholder of the Irvine Company, which owned the Irvine Ranch. With the rapid growth of Southern California during the 1940s and 50s, The Irvine Company was under pressure to develop its property. But in contrast to the unplanned sprawl nearby, the company worked to ensure that development was well planned and included a range of uses on its property such as higher education and agriculture.

Eventually, in the 1970s, the Irvine Foundation was forced to sell its shares in the company and diversify its holdings. When James Irvine died in 1947, his gift to the foundation was valued at $5.6 million. By 2007, these assets had grown to more than $1.8 billion.

References

External links
 The James Irvine Foundation (www.irvine.org)
 Arts program publications The James Irvine Foundation commissioned-publications
 Youth program publications The James Irvine Foundation commissioned-publications
 California Democracy program publications The James Irvine Foundation commissioned-publications
 The Foundation Center: Top 100 U.S. Foundations by Asset Size The James Irvine Foundation is ranked number 32.
 Leadership Awards The James Irvine Foundation Leadership Awards

Non-profit organizations based in California
Organizations based in San Francisco
Organizations established in 1937
1937 establishments in California